Loch Bad an Sgalaig is a small, irregular shaped, freshwater loch and reservoir lying  south of the small village of Poolewe, in Wester Ross, Scotland.

The north west end of the loch, where it outflows to the Eas na Laimh stream, was dammed in 1949 to power the Kerry Falls hydroelectric power station.

The loch was surveyed on 30 July 1902 by T.N. Johnston and John Hewitt and later charted as part of the Sir John Murray's Bathymetrical Survey of Fresh-Water Lochs of Scotland 1897-1909.

References

See also 
 List of lochs in Scotland

Bad an Sgalaig|Bad
Bad